Super Active Wizzo is the only album by the short-lived Wizzo Band, formed by Roy Wood in 1977 to fulfill his more jazz-oriented ambitions. The band also released the two singles "The Stroll", preceding the album, and "Dancin’ at the Rainbow’s End". Neither singles nor album charted and the band split up in 1978.

The line-up included Rick Price (pedal steel guitar), Bob Wilson (trombone), Billy Paul (alto and baritone saxes), Paul Robbins (keyboards, backing vocals), Graham Gallery (bass) and Dave Donovan (drums).

"Waitin' at This Door" was also used as the B-side to "Dancin' at the Rainbow’s End", while "Giant Footsteps" later ended up as the B-side to the Wood solo single "Keep Your Hands on the Wheel".

Track listing
"Life Is Wonderful"  – (Roy Wood) - 8:37
"Waitin' at This Door"  – (Roy Wood) - 5:48
"Another Wrong Night"  – (Roy Wood) - 11:15
"Sneakin'"  – (Roy Wood) - 6:25
"Giant Footsteps [Jubilee]"  – (Roy Wood, Annie Haslam, Dave Donovan) - 5:59
"Earthrise" - (Music:Roy Wood / Lyrics:Roy Wood, Dick Plant)11:22

Personnel
 Roy Wood - guitars, lead and backing vocals, electric sitar, sopranino, alto, tenor and baritone saxophones, clavinet, Moog synthesizer, bass, double bass
 Billy Paul - alto and baritone saxophones
 Bob Wilson - trombone
 Rick Price - pedal steel and electric guitars
 Paul Robbins - backing vocals
 Graham Gallery - bass
 Dave Donovan - drums

References

1977 debut albums
Albums produced by Roy Wood
Warner Records albums